Palpita disjunctalis is a moth in the family Crambidae. It was described by Inoue in 1999. It is found in the Philippines (Mindanao).

References

Moths described in 1999
Palpita
Moths of Asia